Kirsten Holly Smith is an American singer, actress, and writer. She is best known for her portrayal of Dusty Springfield in the musical Forever Dusty, which she co-wrote with Jonathan Vankin.

Career

Dusty Springfield
She developed her characterization of Springfield beginning in 2006 with a workshop production of her one-woman biographical musical on Springfield, which she performed at the University of Southern California. She received a $6,700 grant from the university to stage the performance.

In 2008, Smith presented a revised version of her musical, then-entitled Stay Forever: The Life and Music of Dusty Springfield, at the Renberg Theatre in West Hollywood, California. The show received positive reviews from the Los Angeles Times, L.A. Weekly and other Los Angeles-area publications.

Smith continued to develop her Dusty Springfield piece over the next four years. During this time she revised her play into a full-scale, multi-character musical intended for the New York stage. In 2012, the new version of Smith's Dusty Springfield bio-musical, now entitled Forever Dusty, opened Off-Broadway at New World Stages in New York City. Smith again portrayed Springfield.

Other work
In addition to Forever Dusty, Smith has appeared on stage in plays including Of Mice and Men, Three Sisters and Twelfth Night as well as several films including the lead role in Isle of Lesbos.

References

External links
Forever Dusty web site
Dusty Springfield Musical╒s Kirsten Holly Smith on Adapting the Life of a Complex Legend, Huffington Post
A Dusty Road to Springfield, GALO Magazine
Sixties Icon Dusty Springfield Subject of New Stage Musical, Reuters UK

American women singers
Living people
Place of birth missing (living people)
American actresses
21st-century American women
1980 births